Soyo Group, Inc., often shortened to Soyo, was a United States-based electronics company.  Established in 1985, Soyo was a provider of consumer electronics such as LCD HDTVs, home theater furniture, Bluetooth headsets, portable storage devices, computer monitors, computer motherboards, computer cases, and computer peripheral devices.

With sales offices in California and São Paulo, Brazil, Soyo sold its products through an extensive network of authorized distributors, resellers, system integrators, VARs, retailers, mail-order catalogs and e-tailers.  Soyo licensed the Honeywell brand from Honeywell International Inc. for use on LCD televisions and other consumer electronics products.

Soyo Group filed for Chapter 7 bankruptcy with the United States District Court for the Central District of California, Riverside Division (case number 09-19355-RN), and ceased operations on May 5, 2009.

 Soyo Group brands

 Soyo
 Honeywell
 Privé
 Le Véllo Furniture
 Soyo Computer Inc.

Soyo Computer Inc. a Taiwan-based company made computer components, and were well known for their motherboards. Their headquarters were in Taipei and their sales (at least NA sales) were handled by their CA office. They ceased production of electronics around 2005 and focused on the manufacture of plastics.
While no longer operational in USA and Taiwan, most of the assets were shipped to Shenzhen, China and PC production still goes on for the Chinese market.

References

External links 
 
 SEC filing regarding bankruptcy

1985 establishments in California
2009 disestablishments in California
American companies established in 1985
American companies disestablished in 2009
Companies that have filed for Chapter 7 bankruptcy
Computer companies established in 1985
Computer companies disestablished in 2009
Defunct computer companies of the United States
Defunct computer hardware companies